Carlos Carrillo may refer to:

 Carlos Antonio Carrillo (1783–1852), Governor of Alta California, 1837–1838
 Carlos Carrillo (footballer) (born 1984), Salvadoran footballer
 Carlos Carrillo Parodi, microbiologist
 Carlos A. Carrillo, Veracruz, municipality in Veracruz, Mexico